Beitunia, also Bitunya, is a Palestinian city located  west of Ramallah  and  north of Jerusalem. The city is in the Ramallah and al-Bireh Governorate in the central West Bank. According to the Palestinian Central Bureau of Statistics, the city had a population of 19,761 in 2007, making it the third largest locality in its governorate after al-Bireh and Ramallah.

History
Potsherds from the Byzantine, Mamluk and early Ottoman period have been found.

However, in 1887,  Röhricht identified Beitunia with  Beitiumen, another fief  given by the King to  the Holy Sepulchre. Conder  found this to be "evidently correct" and hence  "very doubtful" that Beitunia  was Uniet. Abel, writing in 1931, suggested  that  Beitunia was Beit Uniet, mentioned in an early 12th-century text.

A large vaulted building in the town,  named Badd al Balad ("oil press of the village") has been dated to the Crusader era.

Ottoman era
The population was 75 households and 5 bachelors, all  Muslim. They paid a fixed tax rated of 33,3% on wheat, barley, olives, vineyards, fruit trees, goats and/or beehives, in addition to occasional revenues; a total of 23,000  akçe.

In 1738 Richard Pococke called it  "a place called Bethany to the north."

The American scholar Edward Robinson noted it in 1838, as a Muslim  village,   part of the  El-Kuds district.

In 1870 the French explorer Victor Guérin found  that Beitunia  contained six hundred inhabitants.  Socin found from an official Ottoman village list from about the same year (1870)  that Beitunia had a total of 147 houses and a population of 481, though the population count included men, only.

Several inscriptions, dating to 1873-74 and forwards, have been described from the house of the village Mukhtar.

In 1883,  the PEF's Survey of Western Palestine  described Beitunia as "A good-sized village of stone, surrounded by olives, standing high on a flat rocky ridge, with a plain to the east. To the east are cisterns, wine-presses, and a pond (el Baliia), which contains water in winter. On the north and east are rock-cut tombs with well-cut entrances, but blocked up."

In 1896 the population of  Betunja  was estimated to be about 1,056 persons.

British Mandate era

In the 1922 census of Palestine conducted by the British Mandate authorities, Beitunia had a population of 948 Muslim,   increasing in the 1931 census to 1,213, still all Muslim, in 277 houses.

Due to a lack of economic opportunities in the early 20th century, many people emigrated. Some went to the Chicago area, and were involved in the startup of the Bridgeview Mosque.

In the 1945 statistics  the population was 1,490, all Muslims, while the total land area was 23,366 dunams, according to an official land and population survey. Of this, 7,854 were allocated for plantations and irrigable land, 8,381 for cereals, while 77 dunams were classified as built-up areas.

Jordanian era
In the wake of the 1948 Arab–Israeli War, and after the 1949 Armistice Agreements, Beitunia came under Jordanian rule.

In 1961, the population of Beituniya was 2,216.

Post-1967
Since the Six-Day War in 1967, Beitunia has been under Israeli occupation. After 1995, under the Oslo Accords, 3,759 dunums (17.8%) of the town's lands were classified as Area A, 472 dunums (2.2%) were classified as Area B, while the remaining 16,896 dunums (80%) were classified as Area C. Israel has confiscated land from Beitunia in order to construct two Israeli settlements: Beit Horon and Giv'at Ze'ev.

According to the Oslo Accords, the IDF is prevented from entering areas A (an area under full Palestinian Authority control), but Operation Defensive Shield in 2002 abolished this distinction when the IDF searched that year in Beitunia for a suspect who wanted to make himself a "martyr." The IDF-search extended to Qalandiya, Bayt Surik, Bayt Deko, al-Judeirah, and Hizma.

Israeli West Bank barrier
Beitunia's land area consists of 2, 617.4 hectares (26,174 dunams) of which 336.2 hectares is built-up area. The Israeli West Bank barrier separates the urban area from 66% of the town's lands, however, most of the cut-off territory (Seam Zone) is made-up of forest and open spaces making it prime agricultural and grazing land.

Salah El-Dein Mosque

Salah El-Dein Mosque is located to the west of the city and was established in 2002. It is named related to the old Muslim leader Salah Al-Dein Al-Ayoubi. It is considered one of the main mosques in the area. It consists of 3 floors and has a capacity for approximately 500 persons.

Killed during Israeli Palestinian conflict
Fadel Abu Zahira (9 years old) was shot and killed on 18 April 2002 in his own home in Beitunia. The bullet came from an armored vehicle and went through the window. Hussein Mahmoud 'Awad 'Alian (17 years old) was killed by Israeli gunfire on 16 April 2004 during demonstrations against the barrier.

Two boys, Nadim Nawarah and Mohammad Odeh, were shot and killed in the Beitunia killings on 15 May 2014. One Israeli policeman was arrested for Nawarah's death, and was later under a plea deal sentenced to 9 months in jail.

References

Bibliography

 (pp. 73, 185)

External links
Welcome To Beituniya
Beitunia, Welcome to Palestine
Survey of Western Palestine, Map 17: IAA, Wikimedia commons
Beituniya Town (Fact Sheet), Applied Research Institute–Jerusalem (ARIJ)
Beituniya Town Profile, (ARIJ)
Beituniya, aerial photo, (ARIJ)
Civil Administration nixes order to take land for settlement road, June 14, 2012, The Times of Israel

Ramallah and al-Bireh Governorate
Cities in the West Bank
Throne villages
Municipalities of the State of Palestine